Taviran-e Sofla (also Romanized as Ţāvīrān-e Soflá; also known as Ţāvīrān-e Vostá) is a village in Sar Firuzabad Rural District, Firuzabad District, Kermanshah County, Kermanshah Province, Iran. At the 2006 census, its population was 100, in 25 families.

References 

Populated places in Kermanshah County